Anthems to the Welkin at Dusk is the second studio album by Norwegian black metal band Emperor. It was released on 8 July 1997 through Candlelight Records and Century Black.

Background 
The album was recorded in the Grieg Hall in Bergen, Norway.

The opening guitar riff to "Ye Entrancemperium" is taken from an unnamed Mayhem song. As such, Mayhem guitarist Euronymous is credited in the album liner notes, even though he was murdered three years before the album was written and recorded. A recording of this unfinished track can be found on the Mayhem bootleg Ha Elm Zalag.

Release 

In 1996, the EP Reverence, which included the track "The Loss and Curse of Reverence", was released as a teaser for the album. Anthems to the Welkin at Dusk was released on 8 July 1997 through Candlelight Records. At the time of its release, it reached number 28 on Finnish album charts.

In contrast to the band's previous album, In the Nightside Eclipse, Anthems showcases a faster, more guitar-driven performance with less usage of keyboards and more clean singing and blast-beat style drumwork. The album's musical approach is explained on the back cover, with a quote that reads "Emperor performs Sophisticated Black Metal Art exclusively". As well, the album's lyrical themes began to move away from nature and Satanic elements and began to incorporate more mystical themes.

In 1998, the album was remastered and re-released with the three non-album tracks from Reverence. The band made a promotional video for "The Loss and Curse of Reverence".

Reception 

According to Steve Huey from AllMusic, the album is a "magnificently-conceived and executed opus that fulfills all of Emperor's promise and ambition. The biggest difference from its predecessor [being] the crisper, clearer production, which allows details in the arrangements to emerge far more readily."

He added that there's greater use of classical flourishes, greater variety in Ihsahn's vocals, more audible guitar interplay between Ihsahn and Samoth and more complex and melodic keyboard work. "It definitely builds on the groundwork laid by extreme metal pioneers Celtic Frost and Bathory: the former with its restless experimentalism, and the latter with its determination to create something quintessentially Scandinavian."

Finally, he concluded: "Anthems to the Welkin at Dusk cemented Emperor's reputation as black metal's greatest band, and Ihsahn as its foremost musical visionary; it also firmly established black metal as an art form that wasn't going away any time soon, and opened up a wide range of creative possibilities to the more progressive, eccentric wing of the genre. In the Nightside Eclipse might epitomize black metal better than any other album, but divorced from outside context, Anthems to the Welkin at Dusk is black metal's greatest stand-alone creative achievement."

In June 2016, Anthems to the Welkin at Dusk was inducted into Decibel Magazine'''s Hall of Fame, becoming the second Emperor album to be featured in the Decibel Hall of Fame, the first being predecessor In the Nightside Eclipse.

In 2017, Rolling Stone ranked Anthems to the Welkin at Dusk as 57th on their list of 'The 100 Greatest Metal Albums of All Time.' In 2018, Loudwire named it the best black metal album of all-time. In 2020, Metal Hammer'' included it in their list of the top 10 1997 albums.

Track listing

Credits

Emperor
 Ihsahn – vocals, guitar; synthesizer, arrangement, production and mastering
 Samoth – guitar, arrangement, mastering and production
 Alver – bass 
 Trym – drums and percussion

Additional personnel
 Pytten – engineering and production
 Yens – sleeve photography
 Stephen O'Malley – sleeve design
 David Palser – sleeve photography
 Christophe Szpajdel – sleeve illustrations and logo
 N. A. P. – sleeve design

References 

Emperor (band) albums
1997 albums